Andry Lalaina Rakotozanany (born 31 January 1983) is a retired Malagasy football midfielder.

References

1983 births
Living people
Malagasy footballers
Madagascar international footballers
AS Port-Louis 2000 players
Association football midfielders
Malagasy expatriate footballers
Expatriate footballers in Mauritius
Malagasy expatriate sportspeople in Mauritius
People from Antananarivo